The 1902 Louisiana Industrial football team was an American football team that represented the Louisiana Industrial Institute (now known as Louisiana Tech University) as an independent during the 1902 college football season. In their first and only year under head coaches Frank Singleton and Howard F. Crandell, the team compiled a 1–1–1 record.

Schedule

References

Louisiana Industrial
Louisiana Tech Bulldogs football seasons
Louisiana Industrial football